Filippo Megli (born 10 May 1997) is an Italian swimmer. He competed at the 2020 Summer Olympics in 4 × 200 m freestyle relay.

He competed in the men's 200 metre freestyle event at the 2017 World Aquatics Championships.

References

External links
 

1997 births
Living people
Italian male swimmers
Place of birth missing (living people)
Italian male freestyle swimmers
Swimmers at the 2015 European Games
European Games competitors for Italy
European Aquatics Championships medalists in swimming
Mediterranean Games gold medalists for Italy
Mediterranean Games silver medalists for Italy
Mediterranean Games medalists in swimming
Swimmers at the 2018 Mediterranean Games
Swimmers at the 2022 Mediterranean Games
Swimmers at the 2020 Summer Olympics
Olympic swimmers of Italy
20th-century Italian people
21st-century Italian people
Sportspeople from Florence